Algarvia alba is a species of sea slug, specifically an aeolid nudibranch. It is a marine gastropod mollusc in the family Facelinidae.

Distribution
This species was described from Sagres, Portugal . It has subsequently been recorded from Cantabria , on the North coast of Spain.

Description
Algarvia alba is a small nudibranch, growing to 15 mm in length. It has a distinctive appearance, with a white body, white cerata and bright orange-red oral tentacles and rhinophores and an orange line across the front of the head.

References

Facelinidae
Gastropods described in 1989